Claris Home Page was one of the earliest true WYSIWYG HTML editors, developed from 1994 on. The project was code-named Loma Prieta.  Claris purchased it from San Andreas Systems, reworked it to use the user interface common to all their products, and released it in 1996.

History 
Home Page supported all of the features common in HTML at the time. In January 1998, the third and final version of Home Page was released. This version contained templates and tools for building database-driven websites using FileMaker Pro 4.1 and Claris Dynamic Markup Language (CDML).

Within weeks of the final Home Page release, parent company Apple Computer reorganized Claris into FileMaker Inc., with Home Page and the FileMaker database as its only remaining products. Home Page was discontinued in 2001, though it continued to run in the Classic Environment of Mac OS X through version 10.4. Home Page was designed for HTML 3.2, and consequently does not support HTML 4.0. Home Page cannot display Portable Network Graphics (PNG) images, and if it is used to upload them, the PNG files will be corrupted and rendered unviewable.

Programmer Sam Schillace, who had developed Claris Home Page with his partner Steve Newman from 1994 on, would later go on to lead the development of Google Docs.

References

Discontinued software
HTML editors
Windows text-related software
Classic Mac OS software
1996 software